The following lists events that happened during 1979 in Cambodia.

Incumbents 
 Monarch: Khieu Samphan (until 7 January), Heng Samrin (starting 7 January)
 Prime Minister: Pol Pot (until 7 January), vacant (starting 7 January)

Events

January

February

March

April

May

June

July

August

September

October

November

December

References

 
1970s in Cambodia
Years of the 20th century in Cambodia
Cambodia
Cambodia